Metadelphax is a genus of delphacid planthoppers in the family Delphacidae. There are at least 5 described species in Metadelphax.

Species
 Metadelphax argentinensis (Muir, 1929)
 Metadelphax dentata Gonzon and Bartlett, 2008
 Metadelphax pero (Fennah, 1971)
 Metadelphax propinqua (Fieber, 1866)
 Metadelphax wetmorei (Muir & Giffard, 1924)

References

 Ding, Jinhua (2006). "Homoptera Delphacidae". Fauna Sinica Insecta, vol. 45, xx + 776.
 Gonzon, Anthony T., and Charles R. Bartlett (2007). "Systematics of Hadropygos n.g., Metadelphax Wagner and New World Toya Distant (Hemiptera: Delphacidae)". Transactions of the American Entomological Society, vol. 133, no. 3+4, 205–277.
 Wagner, Wilhelm (1962). "Dynamische Taxionomie, angewandt auf die Delphaciden Mitteleuropas". Mitteilungen aus dem Hamburgischen Zoologischen Museum und Institut, vol. 60, 111–180.

Further reading

 Arnett, Ross H. (2000). American Insects: A Handbook of the Insects of America North of Mexico. CRC Press.

External links

 NCBI Taxonomy Browser, Metadelphax

Auchenorrhyncha genera
Delphacini